Quentin Halys (born 26 October 1996) is a French professional tennis player.  Halys has a career-high ATP singles ranking of world No. 61 achieved on 16 January 2023 and a doubles ranking of No. 129 achieved on 3 October 2022. He has won six singles titles on the ATP Challenger Tour and seven in doubles.

Junior career
Quentin Halys reached four Junior Grand Slam finals, three in doubles and one in singles. Of the four finals, Halys won the 2014 French Open partnering Benjamin Bonzi. He reached a career high combined (singles and doubles) of World No. 3 on March 31, 2014. He ended his junior career with a 98–44 record on singles and 83–35 on doubles.

2010
Quentin played in his first ITF Junior Circuit tournament in 2010 at the G4 Tournoi International de Clermont-Ferrand, as a wildcard. He lost in the first round. He reached his first final later that year, at the G5 International Junior Saint-Cyprien, in doubles. In an all-French final, Halys and Armel Rancezot lost in the super tiebreak against Julien Delaplane and Alexandre Favrot.

2011
Starting 2011, Halys entered a 17–match win streak, winning consecutively the 1st and 2nd Qatar ITF Junior Open, breaking through the qualifiers of both tournaments to win his first two singles titles. He also finished runner-up in the 1st tournament doubles. He streak was sniped by Belgian Clement Geens, at AEGON Junior International Nottingham, a 2-week G4 tournament. Quentin would reach the final in both singles and doubles of the 2nd week, but he won the doubles only. He would win another doubles titles in July of that year, at the Leeuwenbergh ITF G4 Junior Championships. Halys finished 2011 by playing for France at the Junior Davis Cup, where his country finished 3rd that year.

2012
Starting 2012, Quentin played in all Junior Grand Slams but Wimbledon, where he didn't pass the third round of any of them, in singles. He reached the semifinal at Australian Open doubles. Halys only final that year was at the GA Copa Gerdau, partnering Pedro Cachín, where they lost in straight sets to the partnership of Luke Bambridge and Joshua Ward-Hibbert. He played a second year for his country at the Junior Davis Cup, this time finishing in the fourth place.

2013
In 2013, Halys reached four finals in doubles, including the US Open final, where he lost to Kamil Majchrzak and Martin Redlicki, in partnership with Frederico Ferreira Silva. All other finals were at G1 tournaments, winning only at the 35° Torneo International Citta Di Santa Croce, partnering Benjamin Bonzi. In singles, he lost in the finals of the B1 European Junior Championships to Karen Khachanov.

Halys saw much success ahead of 2014, reaching 7 finals with four titles in doubles and one in singles.

2014
Partnering Johan Sébastien Tatlot, the pair reached the final of the Australian Open, where they lost in straight sets. The partnership would win the GA Porto Alegre Junior Championships (the successor of the Copa Gerdau) in March and the B1 European Junior Championships in July. 

Partnering Benjamin Bonzi, the French pair won the French Open, winning in straight sets. Quentin also won the G1 Canadian Open Junior Championships in partnership with Akira Santillan, winning only two matches to win the title, as the pair received two walkovers in the semifinals and the final. Quentin reached also the US Open in singles, losing to Omar Jasika in three sets. Earlier in July, he defeated countryman Corentin Denolly to win the B1 European Junior Championships, his last singles title in junior.

Professional career

2015-2016: Grand Slam debut & first two wins, first Challenger title
Halys made his Grand Slam debut at the 2015 French Open as a wildcard. He also entered as a wildcard in the 2016 Australian Open main draw where he defeated Ivan Dodig. He lost to the top seed and eventual champion Novak Djokovic in the second round. Again as a wildcard, he recorded his second Major win at the 2016 French Open over Chung Hyeon in the first round.

2021-2022: US Open debut, two more Challenger titles, Masters & top 75 debut
At the 2021 US Open Halys qualified for the first time at this Major in 5 attempts. He lost in the first round to Dominik Koepfer in five sets.

January through March 2022, he won two Challenger titles at the 2022 Teréga Open Pau–Pyrénées and 2022 Play In Challenger in Lille, France and reached two more finals.

He reached the top 100 on 9 May 2022 after a quarterfinal showing at the 2022 Open du Pays d'Aix Challenger. At the 2022 French Open as a direct entry, he lost to 23rd seed John Isner in four tight sets.

On his debut at the 2022 Wimbledon Championships he won his first match at this Major defeating his compatriot Benoit Paire. He reached the top 75 at world No. 74 on 25 July 2022.

He made his Masters 1000 debut after qualifying for the 2022 Rolex Paris Masters.

He finished the year ranked world No. 64 in singles.

2023: First ATP tour-level quarterfinal
Halys reached the quarterfinals of an ATP tournament for the first time in his career in Auckland, after beating Alex Molčan and Ben Shelton. He lost to Jenson Brooksby in the quarterfinals.

Performance timelines

Singles
Current after the 2022 Australian Open

Doubles

Challenger and Futures finals

Singles: 25 (11–14)

Doubles: 16 (10–6)

Junior Grand Slam finals

Singles: 1 (1 runner-up)

Doubles: 3 (1 title, 2 runner-ups)

ITF's Junior Circuit

Singles: 6 (4 titles, 2 runner-ups)

Doubles: 14 (7 titles, 7 runner-ups)

Record against top-10 players

Halys's record against those who have been ranked in the top 10, with active players in boldface. Only ATP Tour main draw matches are considered:

References

External links
 
 

1996 births
Living people
French male tennis players
French Open junior champions
Sportspeople from Bondy
People from Bobigny
Grand Slam (tennis) champions in boys' doubles
21st-century French people